The Mysterious Stranger is a 1920 American silent comedy film directed by Jess Robbins featuring Oliver Hardy.

Cast
 Jimmy Aubrey as The mysterious stranger
 Oliver Hardy as Toreador (credited as Babe Hardy)
 Maude Emory as Señorita
 Vincent McDermott as Cabbie

See also
 List of American films of 1920
 Oliver Hardy filmography

External links

1920 films
1920 comedy films
1920 short films
American silent short films
Silent American comedy films
American black-and-white films
Films directed by Jess Robbins
American comedy short films
1920s American films